Josimar Rosado da Silva Tavares (18 August 1986 – 28 November 2016), simply known as Josimar, was a Brazilian footballer who last played for Chapecoense as a defensive midfielder.

Josimar was one of the victims when LaMia Airlines Flight 2933 crashed on 28 November 2016.

Club career
Born in Pelotas, Rio Grande do Sul, Josimar joined Internacional's youth setup in 2003 at the age of 16. On 21 January 2007 he made his first team debut, coming on as a late substitute in a 0–0 Campeonato Gaúcho home draw against Novo Hamburgo.

Rarely used by Inter, Josimar spent time on loan at Brasil de Pelotas, Fortaleza, Al-Watani and Ponte Preta, establishing himself as a starter with the latter and contributing with three goals in 24 league appearances during their promotion campaign. He scored his first professional goal on 24 October 2008 while still at Fortaleza, netting his team's first in a 2–2 home draw against CRB.

After returning from his loan at Ponte, Josimar renewed his contract with Colorado in December 2011, until 2015. He scored his first top flight goal on 2 September 2012, netting the second in a 4–1 home routing of Flamengo.

On 5 February 2014 Josimar signed a one-year loan contract with Palmeiras, also in the main category. After failing to impress and being heavily criticized by the supporters, he returned to Ponte on 24 September.

On 17 December 2015, Josimar signed a permanent deal with Chapecoense, after his contract with Inter expired. He immediately became an undisputed starter at the club.

Death
On 28 November 2016, whilst at the service of Chapecoense, Josimar was among the fatalities of the LaMia Airlines Flight 2933 accident in the Colombian village of Cerro Gordo, La Unión, Antioquia.

Career statistics

Honours
Internacional
Campeonato Gaúcho: 2012, 2013

Chapecoense
Campeonato Catarinense: 2016
 Copa Sudamericana: 2016 (posthumously)

References

External links

1986 births
2016 deaths
People from Pelotas
Brazilian footballers
Association football midfielders
Campeonato Brasileiro Série A players
Campeonato Brasileiro Série B players
Sport Club Internacional players
Grêmio Esportivo Brasil players
Fortaleza Esporte Clube players
Sociedade Esportiva Palmeiras players
Associação Atlética Ponte Preta players
Associação Chapecoense de Futebol players
Saudi Professional League players
Al-Watani Club players
Brazilian expatriate footballers
Brazilian expatriate sportspeople in Saudi Arabia
Expatriate footballers in Saudi Arabia
Footballers killed in the LaMia Flight 2933 crash
Sportspeople from Rio Grande do Sul